Heliotropium aegyptiacum is a species of flowering plant in the family Boraginaceae, native to Egypt, northwest tropical Africa, Socotra, Kenya, and the Arabian Peninsula. It is favored by desert locusts (Schistocerca gregaria), but is toxic to livestock.

References

aegyptiacum
Flora of Egypt
Flora of Kenya
Flora of Northeast Tropical Africa
Flora of Socotra
Flora of Saudi Arabia
Flora of Yemen
Plants described in 1821